Thomas Ross MacVinish (1 January 1921 – 19 September 1965) was a Scottish footballer who played as an outside left in the Scottish League for Hamilton Academical, Greenock Morton and St Johnstone and in the English Football League for Darlington. He began his senior career with Inverness Caledonian, and was on the books of Preston North End without playing League football for them.

While still playing for Morton, MacVinish lived and trained at Aberdeen, where he kept a grocer's shop.

References

1921 births
1965 deaths
Footballers from Inverness
Scottish footballers
Association football outside forwards
Caledonian F.C. players
Hamilton Academical F.C. players
Preston North End F.C. players
Darlington F.C. players
Greenock Morton F.C. players
St Johnstone F.C. players
Scottish Football League players
English Football League players
Highland Football League players